Anne "Annie" French Hector (Dublin, Ireland, 1825 – London, 10 July 1902) was a 19th-century popular novelist who wrote under the pen name "Mrs Alexander". It has been noted that her works "typically revolve around a young girl torn between money, family and love, often complicated by a legacy."

Life
Born in 1825, she was the only child of Robert French, a Dublin solicitor. Her family claimed to be descended from Irish gentry, the French family of Roscommon and Lord Annaly.  On the paternal side, she was related to the poet Charles Wolfe and on her mother's side, to the Shakespearian scholar, Edmund Malone. Annie's father lost his money in 1844 and moved first to Liverpool, before settling in London.

In London, Annie French made some literary acquaintances, among them the novelists Anna Maria Hall and Eliza Lynn Linton and Household Words sub-editor W. H. Wills. She attracted attention in 1856 with an article in Household Words: "Billeted in Boulogne". She married the explorer and archaeologist Alexander Hector in 1858: "...Alexander Hector married his wife, Anne, on the 15th of April 1858 and there were issue of the marriage, four children, Ida, Alexander, Annie and Mary, aged respectively, ten, eight, five and three years. In October, 1870, Mrs. Hector gave instructions to her solicitors to present a petition in the Divorce Court for a separation, on the ground of cruelty and adultery, but the matter was compromised, and on the 10th of December, 1870, a deed of separation was executed between the defendant, Alexander Hector, of first part, Anne Hector, the wife, of second part..."

Works
Annie wrote several novels during her early life, her first, Kate Vernon, in 1854. However, apparently her husband disapproved of her writing, and so during his lifetime she curtailed her pursuit of continuing to get her work published.

After her husband's death in 1875, she used his first name as her pseudonym and completed over forty novels as "Mrs Alexander", many of them published by George and Richard Bentley. All her books enjoyed wide popularity in the United States, notably The Wooing O't (1873), Ralph Wilton's Weird (1875), Her Dearest Foe (1876), The Freres (1882), A Golden Autumn (1897), A Winning Hazard (1897), and Kitty Costello (1902), her final novel, which was a quasi-autobiographical work detailing a young Irish girl's move to London. Other novels of hers included The Admiral's Ward (1883), The Executor (1885), A Crooked Path (1889) and The Snare of the Fowler (1892).

References

Sources

External links
 Notable Women Authors of the Day by Helen C. Black
 Ricorso website for Irish literary studies devised & compiled by Bruce Stewart
 

1825 births
1902 deaths
19th-century Irish novelists
19th-century Irish women writers
19th-century Irish writers
Victorian women writers
Writers from Dublin (city)
Irish expatriates in the United Kingdom
Irish women novelists
20th-century Irish novelists
20th-century Irish women writers
20th-century Irish writers
Pseudonymous women writers
19th-century pseudonymous writers
20th-century pseudonymous writers